Cristian Karlo Rivero Schoster is a Peruvian television host, actor and male model, most known for being Gisela Valcárcel's co-host in all her TV shows.

Participations

TV Shows

Telenovela

Theater

References

1978 births
Living people
People from Lima
Peruvian television presenters
Peruvian male models
Peruvian male telenovela actors
Peruvian male stage actors
20th-century Peruvian male actors
21st-century Peruvian male actors
Male actors from Lima
Peruvian people of German descent